Dann Paul John Howitt (born February 13, 1964) is an American former professional baseball outfielder.  He played college baseball at Cal State Fullerton, graduating in 1986 and was drafted by the Oakland Athletics in the 18th round of the 1986 Major League Baseball Draft.  He played during six seasons at the Major League Baseball (MLB) for the Athletics, Seattle Mariners, Chicago White Sox.  Howitt played his first professional season with their Class A (Short Season) Medford A's in 1986, and his last with the Colorado Rockies' Triple-A Colorado Springs Sky Sox in 1997.

It was Howitt that got the final hit off Nolan Ryan when he hit a grand slam home run on September 22, 1993, in Ryan's final appearance at the Seattle Kingdome. It was the last game of Ryan's career and Howitt was the second to last batter he ever faced (Ryan injured his arm facing the next batter and left the game before completing the at-bat).

Dann Howitt is currently a contributing baseball writer for the sports section of The Grand Rapids Press.

Sources

External links
, or Retrosheet, or Pura Pelota (Venezuelan Winter League)

1964 births
Living people
American expatriate baseball players in Canada
Baseball players from Michigan
Buffalo Bisons (minor league) players
Cal State Fullerton Titans baseball players
Calgary Cannons players
Chicago White Sox players
Colorado Springs Sky Sox players
Huntsville Stars players
Indianapolis Indians players
Louisville Redbirds players
Major League Baseball outfielders
Medford A's players
Modesto A's players
Nashville Sounds players
Navegantes del Magallanes players
American expatriate baseball players in Venezuela
Oakland Athletics players
People from Battle Creek, Michigan
Seattle Mariners players
Tacoma Tigers players